Providence is an unincorporated community in McDowell County, North Carolina, United States.

References

Unincorporated communities in McDowell County, North Carolina
Unincorporated communities in North Carolina